OUBS may refer to:

 Otaniemi Underground Broadcasting System, cable-TV channel of Aalto University Student Union (AYY)
 Oxford University Broadcasting Society, a student society at the University of Oxford, England